Mongol language may refer to:

 Languages of Central Asia:
 Middle Mongol language, a Mongolic koiné language spoken in the Mongol Empire
 Mongolian language, the official language of Mongolia
 Mongolic languages, a group of languages spoken in East-Central Asia, mostly in Mongolia and surrounding areas
 Languages of Papua New Guinea:
 Mongol language (New Guinea), a Ramu language of Papua New Guinea
 Mongol–Langam languages, a language family of East Sepik Province, Papua New Guinea

See also
 Mongols, a Central and Northern Asian ethno-linguistic group
 Mongo language, a Bantu language